Walajabad taluk is a taluk in the Kanchipuram district of Tamil Nadu, India. The headquarters of the taluk is the town of Walajabad.

Villages in Walajabad taluk
Walajabad taluk contains 80 villages, including:
 Kavanthandalam – a small village located about 20 km from Kanchipuram by road in Tamil Nadu
 Thammanur – a village with about 2,500 residents
 Nathanallur – a small village with about 2,150 residents
 Walajabad – a panchayat town in Kancheepuram district in Tamil Nadu, It is the main town in Walajabad taluk.

See also

 Tehsils of India

References

Now the Present Condition of walajabad Drinking water Complaint (27-06-2019) that the time the corporation water not come properly its came 6day's and 8day's only so affected the People of walajabad

Taluks of Kanchipuram district